Amparo Pacheco (30 November 1924 - 27 April 2017) was a Spanish actress.

Life and career

She was born on 30 November 1924. In 2002, at his 77, she appeared in the TV series Cuéntame cómo pasó.

She died on 27 April 2017 at aged 92. She wasn't recognised in the In Memoriam section of the 32nd Goya Awards alongside the designer David Delfín, who died on 3 June 2017.

Filmography

Film
 2003: Pacto de brujas as Isidra

Television
 2002-2016: Cuéntame cómo pasó as Sagrario
 2012: Stamos okupa2
 2008: El síndrome de Ulises
 2008: La que se avecina  as Matilde
 2006-2007: Manolo y Benito Corporeision as Marita
 2005-2006: A tortas con la vida as Brígida
 2003-2004: Aquí no hay quien viva as Amparo

References

External links
 

1924 births
2017 deaths
20th-century Spanish actresses
21st-century Spanish actresses
Spanish stage actresses
Spanish film actresses
Spanish television actresses